Julien Balbo (born 23 May 1979 in Grenoble) is a professional squash player who represented France. He reached a career-high world ranking of World No. 42 in August 2008.

References 
 

French male squash players
Living people
1979 births
Sportspeople from Grenoble
Competitors at the 2009 World Games